OpenAtom OpenHarmony, or abbreviated as OpenHarmony (OHOS), is an open-source version of HarmonyOS donated by Huawei to the OpenAtom Foundation. Similar to HarmonyOS, the open-source operating system is designed with a layered architecture, which consists of four layers from the bottom to the top, i.e., the kernel layer, system service layer, framework layer, and application layer.

OpenHarmony supports various devices running a mini system such as printers, speakers, smartwatches and any other smart device with memory as small as 128 KB, or running a standard system with memory greater than 128 MB.

The system contains the basic capabilities of HarmonyOS.

History 

The first version of OpenHarmony was launched by the OpenAtom Foundation on September 10, 2019 after receiving a donation of the open-source code from Huawei, with support for devices with RAM volumes ranging from 128 KB to 128 MB.

The OpenHarmony 2.0 (Canary version) was launched in June 2021, supporting a variety of smart terminal devices.

Based on its earlier version, OpenAtom Foundation launched OpenHarmony 3.0 on September 30, 2021, and brought substantial improvements over the past version to optimize the operating system.

A release of OpenHarmony supporting devices with up to 4 GB RAM was made available in October 2021.

Timeline 
 September 10, 2020  – Initial release of OpenHarmony with support for devices with 128 KB  – 128 MB RAM
 April 2021 – OpenHarmony release with support for smartphones and other devices with 128 MB  – 4 GB RAM
 October 2021 – OpenHarmony release with support for additional devices with 4+ GB RAM

Hardware 
OpenHarmony can be deployed on various hardware devices of ARM, RISC-V and x86 architectures with memory volumes ranging from as small as 128 KB up to more than 1 MB. It supports hardware devices with three types of system as follows:

Mini system – running on such devices as connection modules, sensors, and wearables, with memory equal to or larger than 128 KB and equipped with processors including ARM Cortex-M and 32-bit RISC-V.

Small system – running on such devices as IP cameras, routers, event data recorders, with memory equal to or larger than 1 MB and equipped with processors including ARM Cortex-A.

Standard system – running on devices with enhanced interaction, 3D GPU, rich animations and diverse components, with memory equal to or larger than 128 MB and equipped with processors including ARM Cortex-A.

Compatibility certification 
To ensure OpenHarmony-based devices are compatible and interoperable in the ecosystem, the OpenAtom Foundation has set up product compatibility specifications, with a Compatibility Working Group to evaluate and certify the products that are compatible with OpenHarmony.

The following two types of certifications were published for the partners supporting the compatibility work, with the right to use the OpenHarmony Compatibility Logo on their certified products, packaging, and marketing materials.

 Development boards, modules, and software distributions
 Equipment
On April 25, 2022, 44 products have obtained the compatibility certificates, and more than 80 software and hardware products are in the process of evaluation for OpenHarmony compatibility.

Software distributions 
OpenHarmony is the most active open source project hosted on the Gitee platform. As of October 2022, it had 23 open-source software distributions compatible with OpenHarmony for various sectors such as education, finance, smart home, transportation, digital government and other industries.

Oniro OS 
On September 28, 2021, the Eclipse Foundation and the OpenAtom Foundation announced their intention to form a partnership to collaborate on OpenHarmony.

Oniro OS, which is implemented to be compatible with HarmonyOS, was later launched by the Eclipse Foundation in October 2021 for the global market with the founding members including Huawei, Linaro and Seco. Oniro is designed on the basis of open source and aims to be transparent, vendor-neutral, and independent system in the era of IoT.

SwanLinkOS 
Based on OpenHarmony, SwanLinkOS was released in June 2022 by Honghu Wanlian (Jiangsu) Technology Development, a subsidiary of iSoftStone, for the transportation industry. The operating system supports mainstream chipsets, such as Rockchip RK3399 and RK3568, and can be applied in transportation and shipping equipment for monitoring road conditions, big data analysis, maritime search and rescue.

It was awarded the OpenHarmony Ecological Product Compatibility Certificate by the OpenAtom Foundation.

OpenHarmony in Space 
On January 6, 2022, OpenHarmony in Space (OHIS) was reported to be a vital play in the future from a scientific and engineering point of view, expecting to open up opportunities for development in China's satellite systems, and surpass SpaceX’s Star Chain plan with the idea of micro-nano satellite technology.

ZhihongmetaOS 
On August 29, 2022 Hongyuan Zhitong Technology has recently released new software called ZhihongmetaOS, which stands on the surface of the OpenHarmony 3.1 build and has qualified the eligibility for the OpenHarmony 3.1 evaluation and gained the Ecological Product compatibility certificate. This OpenHarmony OS distribution works on higher security, strong business consistency, and improved performance for consumers targeted mainly for business or industrial users. It is reported that focused on OS optimization, component algorithms, industry consulting and planning, hardware design, and production. At the moment, ZhihongmetaOS V1.0 is only available in the public security sector in China. However, the company will soon extend the roots of the respective firmware to more industries. For instance, environmental protection, and water conservation.

See also 
 HarmonyOS

References

External links 
 
 OpenHarmony Project

2019 software
Embedded operating systems
Huawei products
Internet of things
Mobile Linux
Mobile operating systems
Tablet operating systems
Unix variants